Rhoptropus biporosus is a species of lizard in the family Gekkonidae. The species is found in Namibia and Angola.

References

Rhoptropus
Geckos of Africa
Reptiles of Angola
Reptiles of Namibia
Reptiles described in 1957
Taxa named by Vivian Frederick Maynard FitzSimons